{{DISPLAYTITLE:C11H12O5}}
The molecular formula C11H12O5 (molar mass: 224.21 g/mol, exact mass: 224.0685 u) may refer to:

 Sepedonin, a chemical compound with a tropolone moiety
 Sinapinic acid, a naturally occurring hydroxycinnamic acid